Ophelia S. Lewis (born 7 November 1961) is a Liberian author and publisher and humanitarian.

Life
Ophelia S. Lewis published her first book, titled My Dear Liberia, a memoir of pre-civil war Liberia, in 2004. Next she published a book of poems, a collection of short stories, a series of children's books and a novel.  Lewis was an officiating member of the Liberian Writers Network during its formation in 2005. She has been featured in scholarly publications such as Thinking Classroom: An International Journal of Reading, Writing and Critical Reflections and Sea Breeze: A Journal of Contemporary Liberian Writings.

Lewis' writings can be found on several Liberian literary sites. Over the years she has partnered with Liberian organizations such as Women of Fire, L.A.M.A (Liberian Association of Metro Atlanta) and S.H.A.D.E.S of Liberia to rebuild Liberia and its citizens.

References

External links 
 Villagetalespublishing.com
 Ophelialewis.com
 Goodreads.com

1961 births
Liberian novelists
Liberian poets
Living people

Liberian women writers